AD Block may refer to:
 Ad blocking, a Wikipedia article about the blocking of advertisements
 AdBlock, a content filtering and ad blocking extension for Google Chrome
 Adblock Plus, an open source ad blocking expansion
 AD block, a part of Bidhannagar, India